The Pearl Continental Bhurban, usually shortened to PC Bhurban, is a member of Pearl Continental Hotel chain in Pakistan. It is located in the town of Bhurban in Murree, which is famous for its scenic beauty. This place is a popular summer resort for the residents of Islamabad and nearby cities. In August 2008 the Punjab government levied a toll on vehicles entering the hotel, this has angered tourists who have harangued the toll collectors. Local politicians have opposed the imposition of the toll including the Nazims of Rawat, Numbal and Phagwari.

Location
PC Hotel Bhurban  is located at approximately 13 km from 	Murree  Hills and two hours' drive from Islamabad.

Bhurban Accord

This place received much media coverage, locally and internationally, when on March 8, 2008 a political agreement was signed by the two political parties Pakistan Peoples Party and Pakistan Muslim League (Nawaz) here. According to the Bhurban Accord, also known as the Murree Declaration, the two political parties decided to restore the judiciary to pre-Nov 3 position.

Notes

Pearl-Continental Hotels & Resorts
Hotels in Pakistan
Murree
Hotels established in 1996
Hotel buildings completed in 1996